Ulceby is a village and civil parish in North Lincolnshire, England. Ulceby is a rural village surrounded by fields, farms and the nearby villages of Habrough, Wootton and Croxton.

At the 2001 census the village had a population of 1,500 in 631 households, and at the 2011 census the village had grown to 1,711.

Facilities 

Village facilities include a Co-op convenience store and Post Office, village hall and community centre, a playing field, play area, veterinary centre, hairdressers and a guest house. There are fast food outlets: a fish and chip shop and a Chinese takeaway. The village has a preschool and  primary  St Nicholas C of E Primary School.

Ulceby railway station, at Ulceby Skitter, is situated 1 mile, and Ulceby Truck Stop (an HGV park with cafe and petrol station)  from the centre of village.

Religious sites and landmarks are the Anglican church of St Nicholas, Ulceby Seventh-day Adventist Chapel, and a war memorial; Ulceby Methodist Chapel closed in June 2011.

Notable people
Vivian Hollowday – George Cross recipient
Ryan Foster – musician and rapper

References

External links

Ulceby.Net web site
Ulceby War Memorial web site

Civil parishes in Lincolnshire
Villages in the Borough of North Lincolnshire